Jacques Duchesne-Guillemin (né Jacques Duchesne, born 21 April 1910 in Jupille and died 8 February 2012 in Liège) was a Belgian linguist, philologist, and orientalist who was professor at the University of Liège and specialized in ancient Iran.

Duchesne-Guillemin began his teaching career with the untimely death of his collaborator and mentor at the University of Liège, Auguste Bricteux, in 1937, becoming a professor in 1943 and a full professor in 1964.

With the publication of his Zoroaster (a translation of the Gāthās of the Avesta, consisting of seventeen hymns attributed to Zoroaster) in 1948, Duchesne-Guillemin became one of the major figures in the study of the Avestan language of ancient Iran. At different times in his career, he lectured at Columbia University, the University of Chicago, and the University of California at Los Angeles. His 1962 La Religion de l’Iran Ancien is still considered a masterpiece and the best scholarly introduction to Zoroastrianism despite the decades of subsequent developments in the scholarship of the religion. His international reputation culminated in his appointment, in 1973, as editor of the series Acta Iranica.

In 1974, he was awarded an honorary doctorate from the University of Tehran.

Publications
Ormazd et Ahriman, l'aventure dualiste dans l'antiquité, PUF, 1953, 156 pp.
La Religion de l'Iran ancien, Paris, PUF, 1962, 411 pp.
Le Croissant fertile : la découverte de l'Asie antérieure, Paris, 1963.
"Islam et mazdéisme", in Mélanges Mass, 1963, pp. 105-109.
Zoroastre : étude critique, avec une traduction commentée des Gâthâ, Paris, Robert Laffont, 1976, 265 pp.
"Pour l'étude de Hafiz", in Acta Iranica, vol. XXI (1981), pp. 141-163.
Dictionnaire des religions, Paris, PUF (1984).
Les Instruments de Musique dans L'Art Sassanide. Leuven: Imprimerie Orientaliste, 1993, 130 pp.

See also
Charles P. Melville

References

1910 births
2012 deaths
Academic staff of the University of Liège
French philologists
French orientalists
Indo-Europeanists
Linguists of Indo-European languages
Linguists from France
French Iranologists
Zoroastrian studies scholars
20th-century translators
French centenarians
Men centenarians